Sikander Bakht (born 25 August 1957) is a Pakistani cricket analyst and former international cricketer who played in 26 Test matches and 27 One Day Internationals for Pakistan from 1976 to 1989. He was included in the team in place of Ehteshamuddin and took 11 wickets in that Test and 24 wickets in the series.

Sikander Bakht was  part of the support staff for Pakistan Cricket Team in 2003 Cricket World Cupas an Asstt Coach and team Analyst.

Sikander works with  Geo News as a sports analyst since 2011. His reviews are often controversial due to the outspoken nature. He also worked with PTV, Indus TV, ESPN, Star Sports Express News, Indus and Samaa Television as a sports analyst.

References

1957 births
Living people
Pakistan Test cricketers
Pakistan One Day International cricketers
Cricketers at the 1979 Cricket World Cup
Pakistani cricketers
Cricketers from Karachi
Public Works Department cricketers
Pakistan International Airlines cricketers
Sind A cricketers
Sindh cricketers
Karachi Blues cricketers
United Bank Limited cricketers
Punjab (Pakistan) cricketers
Geo News newsreaders and journalists